Verma Malik (13 April 1925 – 15 March 2009) was a Bollywood film songs lyricist. He was an active freedom fighter during the British Raj. He wrote many patriotic songs and bhajans and recited them immediately prior to penning lyrics for films.

Early life and career
Born as Barkatrai Malik, he took name of Verma Malik on the advice of music director Hansraj Behl who helped him in the beginning of his career in the Indian film industry.

He penned lyrics for the first time for a song in film Chakori (1949). Later he wrote songs for other films including Jaggu (1952), Shree Nagad Narayan (1955), Mirza Sahiban (1957), CID 909 (1957), Taqdeer (1958).

He remained away from the film industry for almost 7 years after 1961. He then wrote songs for Dil Aur Mohobbat (1967).

His first big break in Hindi-language films was in Yaadgaar (1970) by Manoj Kumar. He is known for writing the song "Ek Tara Bole". In the same year, Pehchan (1970) got him much attention and he became a prominent film song lyricist for Bollywood. He wrote nearly 500 film songs during his career.

The songs of Roti Kapda Aur Makaan were the biggest hits of his career. Baaki kuchh bacha to mehngai maar gayi finished No 1 in Binaca Geet Mala's 1975 annual ranking. The program's song no 2 that year was Hai hai yeh majboori from the same film. Both were written by Varma Malik.

Filmography
 Chhai (1950) - a Punjabi language film
 Kaude Shah(1953) - a Punjabi language film 
 Vanjara (1954) -a Punjabi language film
 Dost (1954)
 Mirza Sahiban (1957) -  a Punjabi language film
 Taqdeer (1958)
 Bhangra (1959) - a Punjabi language film
 Do Lachhian (1959) - a Punjabi language film
 Guddi (1961) - a Punjabi language film
 Main Jatti Punjab Di (1964) - a Punjabi language film 
Mama Ji (1964)- a Punjabi language film 
 Pind Di Kuri (1967) - a Punjabi language film
 Dil Aur Mohabbat (1968)
 Yaadgaar (1970)
 Pehchan (1970)
 Sawan Bhadon (1970)
 Paras (1971)
 Balidan (1971)
 Hum Tum Aur Woh
 Shor (1972)
 Be-Imaan (1972)
 Victoria No. 203 (1972)
 Anhonee (1973)
 Roti Kapda Aur Makaan (1974)
 Ek Se Badhkar Ek (1976)
 Nagin (1976)
 Jaani Dushman (1979)
 Shakka (1981)
 Do Ustad (1982)
 Hukumat (1987)
 Waaris (1988 film)

Awards and recognition
Filmfare Award for Best Lyricist for Pehchan and again for Be-Imaan (1972).

Death and legacy
Verma Malik died on 15 March 2009 at Juhu, Mumbai, India at age 83. He was a close friend of Pyarelal of the film music directors duo Laxmikant–Pyarelal. Pyarelal paid tributes to him by saying that he was a simple man and very proud of his work. He added that Verma Malik could blend traditional Punjabi folk songs into his film songs very well.

References

External links

1925 births
2009 deaths
Poets from Punjab, India
Punjabi-language poets
Punjabi-language lyricists
Hindi-language lyricists
Indian male songwriters
Urdu-language poets from India
Hindi-language poets
Filmfare Awards winners
People from Firozpur
20th-century Indian musicians
20th-century male musicians